Jang-mi is a Korean feminine name. Its meaning depends on the hanja used to write each syllable of the name. There are 37 hanja with the reading "jang" and 33 hanja with the reading "mi" on the South Korean government's official list of hanja which may be used in given names. One way of writing it in hanja means "rose".

People with this name include:
Kim Jang-mi (born 1992), South Korean sport shooter 
Lee Jang-mi (born 1994), South Korean badminton player

Fictional characters with this name include:
Jang-mi (Rose), in 2007 South Korean webcomic Trace
Baek Jang-mi, in 2008 South Korean film Open City
Kim Jang-mi, in 2011 South Korean film Sunny
Jang-mi, in 2014 South Korean film Man on High Heels
Joo Jang-mi, in 2014 South Korean television series Marriage, Not Dating
Baek Jang-mi, the titular character of 2014–2015 South Korean television series Run, Jang-mi

See also
List of Korean given names

References

Korean feminine given names